Stefan Atanasov Abadzhiev (born 3 July 1934) is a former Bulgarian football forward who played for Bulgaria in the 1966 FIFA World Cup. Abadzhiev played the majority of his club career for Levski Sofia, spending fifteen years at the club. With Levski, he won three league titles and four Bulgarian Cups. He also competed in the men's tournament at the 1960 Summer Olympics.

Honours

Club 
Levski Sofia
 A PFG (3): 1953, 1964–65, 1967–68
 Bulgarian Cup (4): 1956, 1957, 1958–59, 1966–67

References

External links
 Career Statistics at LevskiSofia.info 
FIFA profile

1934 births
Living people
Bulgarian footballers
Bulgaria international footballers
Association football forwards
PFC Levski Sofia players
1966 FIFA World Cup players
First Professional Football League (Bulgaria) players
Olympic footballers of Bulgaria
Footballers at the 1960 Summer Olympics
Bulgarian expatriate footballers
Expatriate footballers in Germany
Bulgarian expatriate sportspeople in Germany
Bulgarian expatriate football managers
Expatriate football managers in Germany
Bulgarian football managers
Borussia Neunkirchen managers
FC 08 Homburg managers